John Hodgkinson may refer to:

John Hodgkinson (actor, born 1766) (1766–1805), English-born actor who moved to the United States 
John Hodgkinson (actor, born 1966), English actor
John Hodgkinson (cricketer) (1873–1939), Australian cricketer
John Hodgkinson (footballer, born 1871) (1871–1944), English footballer
John Hodgkinson (footballer, born 1883) (1883–1915), English footballer